Frantique was an American disco group signed to Philadelphia International Records. They released their self-titled album in 1979. A track from  the album, "Strut Your Funky Stuff" charted on the UK Singles Chart in 1979, peaking at No. 10 in September.

"Strut Your Funky Stuff" was written by Vivienne Savoie Robinson, James Bolden and Jack Robinson.

Discography

Albums
 Frantique (Philadelphia International, 1979)

Singles

References

American disco groups
American girl groups